Okinawa Rendezvous is a 2000 Hong Kong romantic comedy film produced and directed by Gordon Chan, and starring Leslie Cheung, Faye Wong, Tony Leung Ka-fai and Gigi Lai.

While not one of Hong Kong's more significant films of the year, it was claimed by its director that it was filmed in less than 2 months without a script. It was shot entirely in the southern Japanese island of Okinawa and the film features many beautiful views of the island.

Its theme song was sung by Leslie Cheung entitled Without Love (没有爱) and is also found in his 2000 album, Big Heat (大热). Also, there were a few possible sub-themes like Faye Wong's New Tenant (新房客) which is as well available in her 2000 album, Fable (寓言).

Plot
Jimmy Tong (Leslie Cheung) is an expert blackmailer and thief who specialises in white-collar crimes. With his side-kick (Vincent Kok), Jimmy steals a personal diary belonging to a Yakuza leader, Ken Sato (Masaya Kato), intending to use its details as a platform for blackmailing and to extort money. Sato agreed to the uneasy deal and made preparations to pay Jimmy his exorbitant demands only for Sato's girlfriend, Jenny (Faye Wong) to betray him and make off with the money to Okinawa.

Elsewhere, Dat Lo (Tony Leung) was vacationing with his girlfriend (Gigi Lai) and another jilted girl (Stephanie Che) in Okinawa (intending to use the vacation to dump his own girlfriend), but stumbles into Jimmy whom he had little problems recognising as an international crook. From here onwards, Dat set aside his irrelevant plans to dump his companions and sought to devise a plan to entrap and to subsequently arrest Jimmy. Dat tried to convince Jimmy as an accomplice to a new bank heist of which Jimmy needed little persuasion. However, Jenny comes into the frame and before long, both Jimmy and Dat fell in love with her.

Cast and roles
Leslie Cheung as Jimmy Tong
Faye Wong as Jenny
Tony Leung Ka-fai as Dat Lo
Gigi Lai as Sandy
Vincent Kok as Sidekick Kuk Bo
Masaya Kato as Ken Sato
Stephanie Che as Cookie
Asuka Higuchi as Lily

External links
 IMDB entry
 Okinawa Rendez-vous on rottentomatoes.com

2000 films
Faye Wong
Hong Kong romantic comedy films
2000 romantic comedy films
2000s Cantonese-language films
2000s Japanese-language films
China Star Entertainment Group films
Films directed by Gordon Chan
Films set in Okinawa Prefecture
Films shot in Okinawa Prefecture
Japan in non-Japanese culture
2000s English-language films
2000s Hong Kong films